Ernst Peter Lütken Frigast (13 December 1889 – 29 November 1968) was a Danish tennis player. He competed in two events at the 1912 Summer Olympics.

References

1889 births
1968 deaths
Danish male tennis players
Olympic tennis players of Denmark
Tennis players at the 1912 Summer Olympics
Sportspeople from Copenhagen